The Xiaomi Mi Smart Band 6 is a wearable activity tracker produced by Xiaomi Inc. It was announced in China on 29 March 2021, and was available starting 2 April 2021 in China. It has a 1.56-inch, 152 x 486 pixels resolution capacitive AMOLED display and 24/7 heart rate monitor and a SpO2 sensor. It also comes with a NFC variant. Mi Smart Band 6 allows for the unlocking of Windows laptops through Windows Hello.

See also
 Xiaomi
 Mi Smart Band 5
 Mi Smart Band 7
 Xiaomi Mi Smart Band

References 

Sports equipment
Wearable computers
Activity trackers
Xiaomi
Products introduced in 2021
Smart bands